Opolis is an unincorporated community in Crawford County, Kansas, United States.  As of the 2020 census, the population of the community and nearby areas was 104.

History
Opolis was originally called Stateline (from the community's proximity to the Missouri state line), and under the latter name was laid out in 1868. Opolis is derived from the Greek polis, meaning "city".

The first post office in Opolis was established in December, 1868. The post office was also called Stevenstown, Steventown, and Olopolis for some time in its early history.  It has a zip code of 66760.

Geography
Opolis is located in the South Eastern corner of the state of Kansas close to the Missouri state line, approximately  .due south of Kansas City, KS at latitude 37.344 and longitude -94.621. Opolis appears on the Asbury United States Geological Survey Map. It is in the Central time zone and observes Daylight Saving Time.,

Demographics

For statistical purposes, the United States Census Bureau has defined Opolis as a census-designated place (CDP).

Education
The community is served by Pittsburg USD 250 public school district.

References

Further reading

External links
 Crawford County maps: Current, Historic, KDOT

Unincorporated communities in Kansas
Unincorporated communities in Crawford County, Kansas